Untitled is an outdoor 1952 fountain and sculpture by Tom Hardy, installed at the Park Blocks in Eugene, Oregon, United States.

Description and history

Tom Hardy's untitled fountain (1952) is installed at the northeast corner of Eugene's Park Blocks, near the intersection of 8th Avenue and Oak Street. The fountain's bronze sculpture depicts a school of fish, possibly salmon, jumping in and out of the water and measures approximately  x ,  x . Surrounding the sculpture are five water jets. The fountain's base is made of concrete and embedded stones, and measures approximately  x  x .

The work was surveyed and deemed "well maintained" by the Smithsonian Institution's "Save Outdoor Sculpture!" program in August 1993. It was administered the Cultural Services Division of the City of Eugene's Library, Recreation and Cultural Services Department at that time.

See also

 1952 in art
 Hatfield Fountain (1989) by Tom Hardy, Lawrence Halprin, and Scott Stickney (Salem, Oregon)
 Running Horses (1986) by Tom Hardy (Portland, Oregon)

References

1952 establishments in Oregon
1952 sculptures
Bronze sculptures in Oregon
Concrete sculptures in Oregon
Fish in art
Fountains in Oregon
Outdoor sculptures in Eugene, Oregon
Stone sculptures in Oregon